Joaquín Ignacio Figueroa y Mendieta (22 April 1808 – 11 March 1899) was a Spanish politician and businessman.

Biography 
Born in Llerena on 22 April 1808, the only son of Luis Figueroa y Casaus (an afrancesado who moved to Marseille after May 1808 and made a considerable fortune investing in mining companies dedicated to lead extraction in Andalusia) and Luisa Mendieta. Ignacio would inherit his father's companies. He received an education in Paris, and, after working for a time as the representative of the interests of his father in Spain, he settled in Madrid in 1845.

In 1852, he married Ana de Torres, viscountess of Irueste, forming a union between an affluent bourgeois—him—and an aristocrat in economic hardship, so he got to enter aristocratic circles. He earned a seat at the Congress of Deputies for the first time in 1865, replacing the vacant seat left by Manuel García Barzanallana in the district of Guadalajara. He renewed his seat during the reign of Isabella II in 1865 and 1867. He became senator for the first time in the 1867–1868 period. Durante the reign of Amadeo I , Figueroa was elected as deputy in representation of Puentedeume at the 1872 election.

Following the Bourbon Restoration, he was elected member of the Congress in the first election that took place in the new regime in 1876, in representation of Guadalajara; appointed as Senator he renounced to his deputy seat in 1877. He served at the Senate until 1899.

He died in Madrid on 11 March 1899.

References 
Citations

Bibliography
 
 
 
 
 

1808 births
1899 deaths
Members of the Senate of the Spanish Restoration
Members of the Congress of Deputies of the reign of Isabella II
Members of the Congress of Deputies of the Spanish Restoration